From the Depths of Darkness is a compilation album by one-man musical project Burzum, released on 6 December 2011 through Byelobog Productions. It consists of newly re-recorded tracks from Burzum's first two albums, Burzum (1992) and Det som engang var (1993), along with three new tracks.

Track listing

Personnel
Varg Vikernes – vocals, guitar, synthesizer, drums, bass
Pytten – engineering
Davide Bertolini – engineering, production
Naweed Ahmed – mastering
Dan Capp - Cover Art

References

Burzum albums
2011 albums